Yuzhny Ural Orsk is an ice hockey team in Orsk, Russia. They play in the VHL, the second level of ice hockey in Russia.

History
The original club (then Yuzhuralmash) was founded in 1958. It ceased to exist by the end of the 1990s but was revived several years later. In 2008 they became affiliated with Metallurg Magnitogorsk of the Kontinental Hockey League.

External links
Official site

Ice hockey teams in Russia